Cave research, encompassing the study of speleology and biospeleology, is still in its infancy in India. Although there are thousands of caves in India, research expeditions occur in few states. The Siju Cave of state Meghalaya is the first limelighted natural cave from India. Several studies were carried out in this cave in the early 20th century. The Kotumsar Cave of Central India is one of the most explored caves of India, and biologists have classified many types of cavernicoles, i.e. trogloxenes, troglophiles and troglobites, from this cave.
  
The Indian institution mainly engaged in this particular field of research and conversational issues of Indian caves is the Raipur-based National Cave Research and Protection Organisation (founded and headed by Dr Jayant Biswas). The other notable organisation is Meghalaya Adventurer Association (founded and managed by Brian Dermot Kharpran Daly) which mainly involved in the caving and cave explorations of the existing caves of the state Meghalaya.

Caving regions

Andhra Pradesh 
  
 Akka Mahadevi Cavesetc.
 Belum Caves, length: , Belum Village in Kolimigundla mandal of Nandyal district, 
 Borra Caves, length: 
 Guthikonda Caves,
 Guntupalli Caves,
 Moghalrajapuram Caves,
 Undavalli Caves
 Yaganti Caves,
 Eswari devi caves,

Chhattisgarh 
 Aranyak Cave of Kanger Ghati National Park
 Dandak Cave of Kanger Ghati National Park, length: 
 Kailash Caves of Kanger Ghati National Park, length: 
 Devgiri Cave of Kanger Ghati National Park
 Jhumar Cave of Pedawada village Kanger Ghati National Park
 Jogi Cave of Gadiya Mountain Kanker, length: 
 Kailash Cave of Jashpur district, Chhattisgarh
 Kanak Cave of Kanger Ghati National Park (yet unexplored)
 Kapatdwar Cave of Tokapal, Bastar, length: 
 Khuriarani Cave of Bagicha Village Jashpur district, Chhattisgarh, length: 
 Kotumsar Cave of Kanger Ghati National Park, length: 
 Mandhip Khol, Gandai, Rajanandgaon length: 
 Mendhkamaari Cave of Kanger Ghati National Park
 Rani Cave of Tokapal, Bastar, length: 
 Shakal Narayan Cave of Bhopalpatnam, Bijapur district, Chhattisgarh
 Shankanpalli Caves of Bijapur district, Chhattisgarh
 Sheet Cave of Kanger Ghati National Park, length: 
 Singhanpur cave, Raigarh (yet unexplored)
 Sondayi cave, Kanker, length: 
 Tular Cave of Narayanpur District, Chhattisgarh
 Usur Cave of Usur Block, Bijapur district, Chhattisgarh

Haryana 
None of these have been studied scientifically yet.

 Dhosi Hill cave in Aravalli Mountain Range, Narnaul, Mahendragarh district
 Tosham Hill cave in Aravalli Mountain Range, Hisar-Tosham road, Bhiwani district
 Nar Narayan Cave in Sivalik Hills range, Yamuna Nagar district

Madhya Pradesh 

 Bagh Caves of Dhar district
 Bhimbetka cave of Raisen District
 Jana Mana Cave of Kanha National Park
 New cave in Raisen District, few ancient caves of Madhya Pradesh are well known. Few more caves have also been recently limelighted.

Meghalaya 

The Indian state, Meghalaya is famous for its many caves, which attract tourists not only from India but abroad too. A few of the caves in this region have been listed amongst the longest and deepest in the world.

Khasi hills 
 Krem Dam, length: 
 Krem Mawmluh (4th longest in the Indian sub continent)
 Krem Mawsynram
 Krem Phyllut, length: 
 Krem Soh Shympi (Mawlong, East Khasi Hills), length: 
 Mawsmai Cave (show cave exclusively for tourists)

Jaintia hills 
 Ka Krem Pubon Rupasor or The Rupasor Cave
 Krem Kotsati, length: 
 Krem Lashinng, length: 
 Krem Liat Prah, length: approx 31 km (Longest in the Indian Subcontinent)
 Krem Sweep, length: 
 Krem Um-Lawan, length: 
 Krem Umshangktat, length:

Garo Hills 
 Bok Bak Dobhakol, length: 
 Dobhakol Chibe Nala, length: 
 Siju-Dobkhakol, length: 
 Tetengkol-Balwakol, length: 
Most of the caves of these areas were either discovered or surveyed by the Europeans (especially by German, British and Italian cavers). Herbert Daniel Gebauer, Simon Brooks, Thomas Arbenz and Rosario Ruggieri are the most prominent name among them. Brian Khapran-Daly of Meghalaya Adventure association have expedite most of the caves of Meghalaya (stated above). In addition to these, the cavers' associations of Meghalaya have always been found to be active in cave discoveries of that plateau.

Uttarakhand 
 Gauri Udiyar Cave in Bageshwar district
 Khatling Cave in Tehri Garhwal district
 Lakhudiyar Caves in Almora district
 Pandkholi Cave in Ranikhet district
 Patal Bhuvaneshwar Cave in Pithoragarh district
 Rai Cave in Pithoragarh district
 Robber's Cave (Guchhupani) in Dehradun district
 Shivam Cave in Pithoragarh district
 Sukhram Cave in Bageshwar district
 Vashishtha Cave in Rishikesh
and many more scientifically unexplored caves

Cultural importance 

In India, many caves are popular tourist sites. The caves of Ajanta, Udaygiri, Barabar, Undavalli, Pandavleni, Ellora are famous for archaeological finds and ancient architectural value.

Religious importance 

The stalagmite formations present in most natural limestone caves resemble Shiva Linga, a representation of Hindu God Shiva, due to which some of the caves in India are considered of religious import. In addition, several universally known caves related to Buddhism is also exist in India. The same attraction leads local people to visit small caves as it draws tourists to large show caves. In India, Amarnath Temple caves, Vaishno Devi Mandir, Badami Cave Temples, Hulimavu Shiva cave temple, Mahakali Caves, Mandapeshwar Caves, Pandavleni Caves are some of the caves with religious importance.

Current research 
Jayant Biswas and his contemporaries continue to research the biospeleology of Meghalaya, Chhattisgarh, Uttarakhand and Western Ghats to establish India amongst other notable countries on the cave map of the world.

Research is also taking place on Indian cave stalagmites, to estimate the past monsoon climate. Dr Ashish Sinha of California State University is taking major steps to understand the past pattern of Indian monsoons via cave research. In addition, Prof. Rengaswamy Ramesh; Dr. M. G. Yadava of Physical Research Laboratory, Ahmedabad; Prof. Bahadur Kotlia of The Durham, Kumaun University Nainital; Dr. Syed Masood Ahmad & Mahjoor A. Lone, CSIR - National Geophysical Research Institute (NGRI), Hyderabad; Dr. Anoop Kumar Singh of The Lucknow, Department of Geology, University of Lucknow; and Dr. Jayant Biswas, National Cave Research and Protection Organisation, India, also initiated some research in this direction.

Besides Dr. Biswas, Prof. G. Marimuthu of Madurai Kamaraj University, Madurai (Chiropterology - study of Bats);  Prof. Y. Ranga Reddy Acharya Nagarjuna University (micro Crustacean: Taxonomy); Dr. Daniel Harries of Edinburgh (Cave Biodiversity) and Dr. Adora Thabah of Bristol University (Chiropterology - study of Bats); Prof. R. K. Pradhan Pandit Ravishankar Shukla University of Raipur (Chronobiology); Prof. Ramanathan Baskar Guru Jambheshwar University of Science and Technology, Hisar, Haryana (Cave Geomicrobiology) are some of the known researchers who have tried to shed some light on the Biospeleology (study of organisms that live in caves) of Indian caves.

The very first Text cum Research Reference Book from India is published in the year 2022, titled "Cave Science, Insight from the Indian Subcontinent"
The book is Published by National cave Research and Protection Organization, edited by Jayant Biswas. This book contains total Eight Chapters, covering -Indian Caves, -Paleoclimatology, -Biospeleology, -Chiropterology, -Geomicrobiology, -Hydrogeology, -Palaeoanthropology and -Cave Conservancy.

Conservation 
Unscientific quarrying of limestone led to the collapse of the Mawmluh cave of Meghalaya, and the caves of Jantia Hills are also in danger due to excessive quarrying of coal. Various caves in Central India serving as major religious spots are also either under threat conditions or somehow polluting the ambient environment.

The 'National Cave Research and Protection Organisation, India' has been formed to help protect the caves of India. This organization has already urged the Indian government to frame a proper Cave Protection Act. In addition, members of the Meghalaya Adventures Association (principally, Brian Kharpan Dally) work to protect the natural caves of Meghalaya.

See also 

 List of India cave temples
 List of Caves in India
 List of rock-cut temples in India
 Indian rock-cut architecture
 List of colossal sculpture in situ
 Pit cave
 List of caves

References 

Anoop Kumar Singh High Resolution Palaeoclimatic Changes in Selected Sectors of the Indian Himalaya by Using Speleothems
Bahadur Singh Kotlia*, Anoop Kumar Singh, Lalit Mohan Joshi, Bachi Singh Dhaila Precipitation variability in the Indian Central Himalaya during last ca. 4,000 years inferred from a speleothem record: Impact of Indian Summer Monsoon (ISM) and Westerlies
Bahadur Singh Kotlia, Anoop Kumar Singh*, Jian-Xin Zhao, Wuhui Duan, Ming Tan, Arun Kumar Sharma, Waseem Raza Stalagmite based high resolution precipitation variability for past four centuries in the Indian Central Himalaya: Chulerasim cave re-visited and data re-interpretation

External links
 Anoop Kumar Singh High Resolution Palaeoclimatic Changes in Selected Sectors of the Indian Himalaya by Using Speleothems
 Biswas Jayant 2010 Kotumsar Cave biodiversity: a review of cavernicoles and their troglobiotic traits
 Biswas Jayant 2009 The biodiversity of Krem Mawkhyrdop of Meghalaya, India, on the verge of extinction
 Ashish Sinha, Gayatri Kathayat,	Hai Cheng, Sebastian F. M. Breitenbach,	Max Berkelhammer, Manfred Mudelsee, Jayant Biswas	& R. L. Edwards 2015 Trends and oscillations in the Indian summer monsoon rainfall over the last two millennia
 Harries, D.B., Ware, F.J., Fischer, C.W., Biswas,  J. and Khapran-Daly, B.D. 2008 A Review of the Biospeleology of Meghalaya, India
 Sinha Ashish, Berkelhammer Max , Stott Lowell , Mudelsee Manfred, Cheng Hai and Biswas Jayant 2011 The leading mode of Indian Summer Monsoon precipitation variability during the last millennium
 Harries, D.B., Ware, F.J., Fischer, C.W., Biswas,  J. and Khapran-Daly, B.D. 2008 A Review of the Biospeleology of Meghalaya, India
 Ruggieri Rosario, Biswas Jayant 2011 The Karst Mandhip Khol-python cave complex in the lenticular limestone intercalations of the metamorphic Chhatrela formation (Chhattisgarh, India)
 Rajput Yogita and Biswas Jayant 2012 Subterranean Depth Dependent Protein Constitutions of the Micrococcus sp., Isolated from the Kotumsar Cave, India
 Baskar Sushmitha and Baskar Ramanathan 2014 A Summary of Some Microbes Identified from Different Indian Caves and Their Possible Role in Mineral Formations 
 Biswas Jayant 2014 Occurrence and Distribution of Cave Dwelling Frogs of Peninsular India
 Mahjoor Ahmad Lone et al., 2014 Speleothem based 1000-year high resolution record of Indian monsoon variability during the last deglaciation

External links 

 caves.res.in National Cave Research and Protection Organization, India
 https://www.youtube.com/ Types of caves in India
 https://www.youtube.com/ Meghalayan Age in details
 https://www.youtube.com/ Biggest Cavefish from India

 
Research in India
Cave research